Kawaleria Szatana (Polish Satan's Cavalry) is the third studio album by the Polish heavy metal band Turbo. It was released in 1986 in Poland through Pronit. The album was recorded in from December 1985 to January 1986 at Giełda studio, Poznań. The cover art was created by Zbigniew Kosmalski.

Kawaleria Szatana is considered to be one of the most important albums in the history of Polish rock.

Track listing

Personnel

Release history

References

1987 albums
Turbo (Polish band) albums
Polish-language albums